Charlie Midnight (born Charles Kaufman, 1954) is an American songwriter, record producer, and founder of Midnight Production House. He has been nominated for the 1987 Grammy Award for Best R&B Song (Writer, "Living in America" by James Brown), two Golden Globes, and has been a producer and/or writer on several Grammy-winning albums, including The Bodyguard: Original Soundtrack Album, Joni Mitchell's Turbulent Indigo, and Marlo Thomas & Friends: Thanks & Giving All Year Long. He also is a writer on the Barbra Streisand Grammy-nominated, Platinum-selling Partners album having co-written the Barbra Streisand and Andrea Bocelli duet "I Still Can See Your Face."

Early life
Midnight was born in Brooklyn, New York to Louis Leo Kaufman (1916-1993), a factory worker and World War II veteran, and Bella Hanft (1918-2012). He was raised in Bensonhurst, a working-class neighborhood, and attended Lafayette High School. He aspired to enter acting (according to his high school yearbook) or pursue poetry. Before deciding to become a musician, Midnight briefly attended Brooklyn College. His first musical foray was in London, England with a band before he returned a few months later to the United States. Midnight worked various jobs to support his music career, such as being employed as a suit salesman and a legal proofreader.

Career

Initial solo career 
Although primarily known as a producer and songwriter for other artists, Midnight actually began his career as a singer and musician himself. He performed in several groups throughout the late 1970s and early 1980s, which culminated in the release of his solo album Innocent Bystander in 1982. Shortly after his first and last solo album (which he deemed a commercial failure based on its reception), Midnight came to the attention of famed singer-songwriter, musician and producer Dan Hartman. The two began collaborating on songwriting, forming a musical partnership that would last until Hartman's death in 1994.

Songwriting and producing 
Midnight's first producing job was the Time Bandits' 1987 album Can't Wait for Another World with Hartman as the executive producer. He went on to produce and write songs for more than 30 films including Rocky IV, The Bodyguard, Bull Durham, Lizzie McGuire and Ruthless People, as well as for such varied artists as Cher, Billy Joel, Joni Mitchell, Seal, Barbra Streisand, Andrea Bocelli, Britney Spears, Christina Aguilera, James Brown, Chaka Khan, Joe Cocker, The Doobie Brothers, "Weird Al" Yankovic, Jamey Johnson, George Thorogood, John Waite, Hilary Duff, Dan Hartman, Paul Stanley and Paul Young.

In 1987, Midnight was nominated for the Grammy Award for Best R&B Song for co-writing "Living in America", a song for which James Brown won the Best R&B Vocal Performance, Male. During the same year, Midnight co-wrote two Joe Cocker songs ("Trust in Me" and "A Woman Loves a Man") for Cocker's Unchain My Heart album. In 1992, an updated version of "Trust in Me" (this time with Sass Jordan on backing vocals) was released on The Bodyguard: Original Soundtrack Album, which won the 1994 Grammy Award for Album of the Year. In 1988, he was twice nominated for the Golden Globe Award for Best Original Song. Firstly, for the aforementioned "A Woman Loves a Man" which was re-released in the 1988 movie Bull Durham. Secondly, for the song "Why Should I Worry?" from the 1988 Disney animated film Oliver & Company. In 1994, the song "How Do You Stop"—which he co-wrote with Dan Hartman for James Brown's 1986 album Gravity—was covered by Joni Mitchell on her album Turbulent Indigo in a version that featured vocals by Seal. The album later won the 1996 Grammy Award for Best Pop Album.

In 2004, it was announced that Midnight signed a publishing deal with Famous Music Publishing. That same year, he wrote and produced "I'll Give Anything But Up" (sung by Hilary Duff) for the 2006 Grammy Award for Best Spoken Word Album for Children-winning children's album Marlo Thomas & Friends: Thanks & Giving All Year Long. In 2010, Midnight co-wrote with Jamey Johnson the song "My Way To You", which appeared on the latter's album The Guitar Song (nominated in 2011 for the Grammy Award for Best Country Album). The same year, Midnight co-wrote "Welcome To Burlesque"—Cher's first song in the feature film Burlesque. Its soundtrack album won the 2012 Grammy Award for Best Compilation Soundtrack for Visual Media. In 2012, Midnight co-wrote two specialty lyrics for Barbra Streisand for her Back To Brooklyn tour on "As If We Never Said Goodbye" from Sunset Boulevard and "You're the Top" from Anything Goes. During the same year, "Welcome To Burlesque" (sung by Cher and co-written by Charlie Midnight) appeared on the Grammy-Nominated Soundtrack Album "Burlesque" (Best Compilation Soundtrack Album for Visual Media). In 2014, Midnight co-wrote the duet "I Still Can See Your Face" (performed by Streisand and Andrea Bocelli) for Streisand's Partners album. Partners reached No. 1, which made Streisand the only artist to have a Number One album in each of the past six different decades. Furthermore, the album was Grammy nominated for Best Traditional Pop Vocal Album. In 2018, Midnight co-wrote the song "The Rain Will Fall" with Streisand, Jay Landers, and Jonas Myrin.

Continuing his success in having his songs featured in films, Midnight co-wrote the song "Keep On Movin'" (sung by Thomas Hien) for the Disney feature film Alexander and the Terrible, Horrible, No Good, Very Bad Day and co-wrote "The Healing" (performed by Gedeon Luke and the People) featured in the 2015 film Get Hard. Collaborating with Idina Menzel and Walter Afanasieff, Midnight wrote "December Prayer," for Menzel's "Holiday Wishes": Number One Billboard Holiday Album

He co-wrote the song "Big Time Rush", which served as the theme song for the hit Nickelodeon series of the same name. He also won a BMI Cable Award at the 2006 BMI Awards for the theme song to the comedy series Daisy Does America. Midnight worked with Jordyn Jones on her song, I'm Dappin. He has worked extensively as a writer and a producer for artists from all around the world. These include such notable international artists as Lin Yu-chun (Taiwan), Tata Young (Thailand), Chage and Aska (Japan), Peter Maffay and Yvonne Catterfeld (Germany), Gölä (Switzerland) Saint Lu (Austria) Time Bandits (Netherlands), El Último de la Fila (Spain), Rhydian (UK), Dodo and the Dodos (Denmark), Sahlene and Don Patrol (Sweden), Rodsogarden (Finland), Rouge (Brazil).

Artists 
Listed alphabetically
 2 Live Crew: "Living In America" - Co-Writer
Anastacia: "Stay" – Writer on her album Resurrection
Christina Aguilera: "This Year" (Christmas album My Kind of Christmas) – Writer
Big Time Rush: Big Time Rush theme song – Writer
Andrea Bocelli and Barbra Streisand duet: Writer "I Still Can See Your Face" on Ms. Streisand's number one Partners album
Zach Brandon: Cowriter on the song “Live and Let Live (feat. Jallal)"
James Brown: "Living In America" (Gravity album)
Kristin Chenoweth: Happiness Is...Christmas! album – Cowrote the song "The Stories That You Told” with Jay Landers 
Cher: "Welcome To Burlesque" (Film: Burlesque) Thanksgiving 2010 release
 Lauren Christy: "My Spot in the World" (102 Dalmatians soundtrack album) – Writer
Joe Cocker: Unchain My Heart album; One Night Of Sin album – Producer and writer; "Love Lives On" (Harry & The Hendersons feature film) – Producer
Miranda Cosgrove: "Raining Sunshine" End Title song and soundtrack album from Sony animated feature Cloudy With A Chance Of Meatballs - Writer
The Doobie Brothers: "Cycles" Album – Writer and producer of various tracks including "The Doctor" (Top Five Single); Take Me To The Highway live album – Producer of album, writer of various tracks
Hilary Duff: Lizzie McGuire soundtrack, Writer and producer; Hilary Duff Christmas Album ("Santa Claus Lane"), Writer and producer; Metamorphosis album, Writer and producer on various songs including the hit song, "So Yesterday"
Sheena Easton: "When The Lightning Strikes Again" – Writer
Kendra Erika: Cowriter on the song "Song Of Hope”
Natalie Gelman: Streetlamp Musician  – Writer and producer
Dan Hartman: I Can Dream About You album (except the title song and "Electricity") – Writer
Hotel Blue: Cowriter on the song "The Blue Hotel" on the Big Night in Byzantium album
Natalie Imbruglia:  "Outside Looking In" – Writer
Billy Joel: "Why Should I Worry" (Oliver & Company, Disney animated feature) – Writer
Jamey Johnson: "My Way To You" – Writer
Chaka Khan: "Can't Stop The Street" (Top Ten Dance Single – Krush Groove soundtrack) – Writer
Lil' Romeo: Hilary Duff Christmas Album, duet on "Tell Me A Story" – Writer and producer
Idina Menzel: Co-writing songs with Ms. Menzel and Walter Afanasieff for original musical; performs "God Save My Soul" from musical in concert; "December Prayer" – Writer on Ms. Menzel's Christmas album
Joni Mitchell: "How Do You Stop" (Turbulent Indigo album) – Writer
Barb Morrison: Producer during Morrison's time as the member of a band during the 1990s
Rvkah: Cowriter on song "Christmas Love" on her Love EP
Seal: "How Do You Stop" (duet w/ Mitchell, "Turbulent Indigo") – Writer
Britney Spears: "Shadow" (In The Zone album) – Writer
Paul Stanley: "It's Not Me" – Writer – Live to Win album
Emma Stevens: To My Roots album (Cowriter on various songs); Atoms EP (Cowriter)
Barbra Streisand: 2012 "Back To Brooklyn" tour  – Writer of specialty lyrics
George Thorogood: "American Made" – Writer
John Waite: "Sometimes" ("Rover" Album) – Writer
"Weird Al" Yankovic: "Living With A Hernia (parody of "Living In America")
Paul Young: "I'm Only Fooling Myself" (Time to Time album) – Writer

Films and soundtrack albums 
Listed alphabetically
102 Dalmatians – "My Spot In The World" on soundtrack album – Writer
Alexander And The Very Bad Day – "Keep On Movin"" – Writer
Barbershop 2: The Next Cut - "The Healing" – Writer
The Bodyguard – "Trust In Me" (Joe Cocker/Sass Jordan) – Writer/Producer
Breakin' – "Breakin'...The Heart Of The Beat" (3-V) – Writer
Bull Durham – "A Woman Loves A Man" (Joe Cocker) – Writer/Producer
Burlesque: Starring Christina Aguilera And Cher: "Welcome To Burlesque" (Artist – Cher) – Writer
Casual Sex?  – "Behind Your Eyes"  – Writer/Producer
Cloudy With A Chance Of Meatballs: "Raining Sunshine" (Miranda Cosgrove) – Writer
Cheaper By The Dozen: "What Christmas Should Be" (Hilary Duff)
Come Away Home – Various Songs – Writer/Producer
Desperado – "Back To The House That Love Built" (Tarantula) -Writer/ Producer
Eye Of The Tiger – "Gravity" – Writer
Fletch – "Get Outta Town" (Dan Hartman) – Writer
Get Hard – Co-writer on the soundtrack song "The Healing"
Great Expectations – "Walk This Earth Alone" (Lauren Christy) – Writer/Producer
Green Street Hooligans – "One Blood" –Writer/Producer
Gunmen – "This House"  (The Cruzados) – Writer/Producer
Harry and the Hendersons – "Love Lives On" (Joe Cocker) – Producer
Iron Eagle ll – "Gimme Some Lovin'"  – Producer
The Jackal – "It's Over, It's Under" (DollsHead) – Writer/Producer
Kim Possible: A Sitch In Time  – "It's Just You" (LMNT) – Writer
Krush Groove – "Can't Stop The Street" (Chaka Khan) – Writer
The Lizzie McGuire Movie -"Why Not" (single) (Hilary Duff)- Writer, "Girl In The Band" (Hilary Duff)- Writer/Producer "Girl In The Band"(Haley Duff)- Writer & Producer
Naomi & Wynonna: Love Can Build a Bridge – "Dream Time"  – Writer
Oliver & Company – "Why Should I Worry" (Billy Joel) – Writer
Perfect – "Talking To The Wall" (Dan Hartman) – Writer
Raise Your Voice – "Jericho" (Hilary Duff) – writer and producer
Return to Me – "Here I Am" – Writer/Producer
Ringmaster – "Living in America" (2 Live Crew version) – Writer
Rock 'n' Roll High School Forever – "Riot In The Playground" – Writer
Rocky IV – "Living In America" (James Brown) – Writer
Ruthless People – "Waiting to See You" (Dan Hartman) -Writer
The Santa Clause 2 – "Santa Claus Lane"  (Hilary Duff) – Writer/Producer
Street Fighter  – "Something There" – (Chage & Aska, major Japanese recording stars)- Writer
Teenage Mutant Ninja Turtles  – "9.95" – Writer
Teenage Mutant Ninja Turtles II – "Consciousness" – Writer
Wild Things – "I Want What I Want" (Lauren Christy) – Writer

Other writer credits

Television credits

Nominations 
 Grammy Award Nomination for Best R&B Song – 1987 – "Living in America" performed by James Brown
 Golden Globe Award Nomination for Best Original Song – 1988 – "Why Should I Worry?" performed by Billy Joel, from Oliver & Company
 Golden Globe Award Nomination for Best Original Song – 1988 – "A Woman Loves a Man" performed by Joe Cocker, from Bull Durham
 Grammy Award for Best Album for Children – 1990 – Oliver & Company : Story and Songs from the Motion Picture performed by various artists
 BMI Cable Award – 2006 – Daisy Does America.

Writings 

 Deserve's Got Nothing to Do With It: Five Elements That Will Help You Survive Your Emotional Journey to Success (2021). Virginia: Mascot Books. ISBN 9781684018352. In the book, Midnight mentions writing the screenplay Boulevard and the Beast—which was never released as a film.
 "The Tire Iron" (2021). Calliope on the Web, Winter 2021–Issue 170.

Personal life 
Midnight and his wife Susanna have a daughter, Shantie.

References

External links 

 

Living people
Songwriters from New York (state)
Record producers from New York (state)
1949 births